Đuro Savinović (1 March 1950 – 1 February 2021) was a Croatian water polo player. He competed in the men's tournament at the 1976 Summer Olympics.

See also
 List of World Aquatics Championships medalists in water polo

References

External links
 

1950 births
2021 deaths
Croatian male water polo players
Olympic water polo players of Yugoslavia
Water polo players at the 1976 Summer Olympics
Sportspeople from Dubrovnik